The 2005 NCAA Division I softball season, play of college softball in the United States organized by the National Collegiate Athletic Association (NCAA) at the Division I level, began in February 2005.  The season progressed through the regular season, many conference tournaments and championship series, and concluded with the 2005 NCAA Division I softball tournament and 2005 Women's College World Series.  The Women's College World Series, consisting of the eight remaining teams in the NCAA Tournament and held in Oklahoma City at ASA Hall of Fame Stadium, ended on June 8, 2005.

Conference standings

Women's College World Series
The 2005 NCAA Women's College World Series took place from June 2 to June 8, 2005 in Oklahoma City.

Season leaders
Batting
Batting average: .524 – Lauren Wible, Bucknell Bison
RBIs: 77 – Samantha Findlay, Michigan Wolverines
Home runs: 26 – Stephanie Best, UCF Knights

Pitching
Wins: 50-9 – Monica Abbott, Tennessee Volunteers
ERA: 0.36 (14 ER/272.2 IP) – Cat Osterman Texas Longhorns
Strikeouts: 603 – Monica Abbott, Tennessee Volunteers

Records
NCAA Division I season at bats:
270 – Lindsay Schutzler, Tennessee Volunteers

NCAA Division I season Games pitched:
69 – Monica Abbott, Tennessee Volunteers

Sophomore class strikeouts:
603 – Monica Abbott, Tennessee Volunteers

Junior class No hitters:
8 – Alicia Hollowell, Arizona Wildcats

Junior class strikeout ratio:
15.2 (593 SO/272.2 IP) – Cat Osterman, Texas Longhorns

Senior class doubles:
27 – Cameron Astiazaran, UIC Flames

Team shutouts:
51 – Tennessee Volunteers

Awards
USA Softball Collegiate Player of the Year:
Cat Osterman, Texas Longhorns

Honda Sports Award Softball:
Cat Osterman, Texas Longhorns

Women's Sports Foundation Sportswoman of the Year Award Team
Cat Osterman, Texas Longhorns

Best Female College Athlete ESPY Award
Cat Osterman, Texas Longhorns

All America Teams
The following players were members of the All-American Teams.

First Team

Second Team

Third Team

References

External links